Party of Donkeys or Donkeys' Party (Donkey is epitome of docile imbecility) was a frivolous political party in Iran. It was founded in 1963, when the New Iran Party vs. the People's Party rivalry was shaped. The party had members with green membership cards and held gatherings.

"Donkeys of Iran and the World Unite! Create a world in which donkeys can live in comfort. Support the creation of a Bank of Hay. Oppose and end all donkey-like despotism. Create an atmosphere in which every donkey can freely bray", were among the principles declared by the party.

References 

Joke political parties
1963 establishments in Iran
Political parties established in 1963
Donkeys
Political parties in Pahlavi Iran (1941–1979)
Political parties disestablished in 1971